Uno di più all'inferno (internationally released as One More to Hell, Full House for the Devil,  and To Hell and Back) is a 1968 Italian Spaghetti Western directed by Giovanni Fago (here credited as Sidney Lean) and starring George Hilton.

Premise
Ended up in jail for love affairs, the adopted son of a pastor escapes, takes part in a robbery, falls in love and avenge his father's death.

Cast
 George Hilton: Johnny King
 Paolo Gozlino: Meredith (credited as Paul Stevens)
 Claudie Lange: Liz
 Gérard Herter: Ernest Ward
 Paul Muller: George Ward
 Carlo Gaddi: Gary
 Pietro Tordi: Pastor Steve

Release
The film was released in Italy on August 17, 1968.

References

External links
 
 Uno di più all'inferno at Variety Distribution

1968 films
English-language Italian films
Spaghetti Western films
1968 Western (genre) films
1968 directorial debut films
1960s English-language films
Films directed by Giovanni Fago
1960s Italian films